Héctor Anglada (January 31, 1976 – March 2, 2002) was an Argentinian film and television actor.

He died in a road accident.

Filmography
 Cuesta abajo (1995)
 La Furia (1997) aka The Fury
 Mala época (1998)
 Pizza, birra, faso (1998) aka Pizza, Beer, and Cigarettes
 La Expresión del deseo (1998)
 El Camino (2000) aka The Road
 Herencia (2001) aka Inheritance
 Bolivia (2001)

Television
 R.R.D.T (1997) TV Series
 Gasoleros (1998) TV Series
 Campeones de la vida (1999) TV Series aka Champions of Life
 Enamorarte (2001) TV Series aka Young Lovers

Awards
Wins
 Argentine Film Critics Association Awards: Silver Condor;  Best New Male Actor; for Pizza, Beer, and Cigarettes; 1999.

References

External links
 
 

1976 births
2002 deaths
Argentine male film actors
People from Córdoba Province, Argentina
Road incident deaths in Argentina
Burials at La Chacarita Cemetery